The following is a list of Germany women's national rugby union team international matches.

Overall 

Germany's overall international match record against all nations, updated to 21 December 2022, is as follows:

Full internationals

1980s

1990s

2000s

2010s

2020s

Other matches

References 

Germany
Rugby union in Germany